"Postcards from a Young Man" is a single by the Welsh alternative rock band Manic Street Preachers. It was the third single released from their tenth studio album, Postcards from a Young Man, on 28 February 2011.

Release 
"Postcards from a Young Man" entered the UK Midweek Charts at 36 but dropped to 54 when the official singles chart was announced at the end of the week.

In January 2012, a vinyl version of the single became the tenth best-selling 7" vinyl in the UK during 2011.

Track listing

Charts

References

External links 
 
 

2011 singles
Manic Street Preachers songs
Song recordings produced by Dave Eringa
Songs written by James Dean Bradfield
Songs written by Nicky Wire
Songs written by Sean Moore (musician)
2010 songs